or Geishū was a province in the Chūgoku Region of western Honshū, comprising the western part of what is today Hiroshima Prefecture.

History
When Emperor Shōmu ordered two official temples for each province (one for male Buddhist priests and one for nuns), two temples were founded in Aki Province. The provincial temple was founded in present-day Saijō, Higashihiroshima.

In the late Heian Period (12th century), Aki Province became well known for the Itsukushima Shrine. Taira no Kiyomori realized the shrine's importance and donated funds for a new complex of buildings and sutra scrolls. Itsukushima (Miyajima) had a good sea port and had clear strategic significance.

In the Sengoku Period, it was the original seat of the Mōri clan until 1600. In 1555, Mōri Motonari won the Battle of Itsukushima against Sue Harutaka and established his power in the western part of Honshū.

Mōri Terumoto, one of the Council of Five Elders Toyotomi Hideyoshi appointed for his son Hideyori, sided with Ishida Mitsunari before the Battle of Sekigahara in 1600, and lost Aki and many of his other domains.

After a short rule by Fukushima Masanori, in 1619, Asano Nagaakira was appointed as the daimyō of Hiroshima Domain with 420,000 koku. Until the Meiji Restoration, the Asano governed almost all the province.

Aki Province was abolished in 1871, and renamed to Hiroshima Prefecture.  After some mergers the current area of Hiroshima Prefecture was established.

Shrines and temples
Itsukushima jinja was the chief Shinto shrine (ichinomiya) of Aki.

Historical districts
 Hiroshima Prefecture
 Aki District
 Kamo District - dissolved
  - merged with Takamiya District to become  on October 1, 1898
 Saeki District - dissolved
  - merged with Numata District to become Asa District on October 1, 1898
 Takata District - dissolved
 Toyota District
 Yamagata District

Notes

References
 Nussbaum, Louis-Frédéric and Käthe Roth. (2005).  Japan encyclopedia. Cambridge: Harvard University Press. ;  OCLC 58053128

External links 

 "Aki Province" at JapaneseCastleExplorer.com
  Murdoch's map of provinces, 1903
 National Archives of Japan:  Itsukushima kakei, illustrated scroll describing Itsukushima, text by Kaibara Eiken (circa 1720)

Former provinces of Japan
History of Hiroshima Prefecture
States and territories disestablished in 1871